The seventh season of American talent show competition series America's Got Talent was broadcast on NBC from May 14 to September 13, 2012. Following the previous season, Piers Morgan left the program due to other commitments, and was replaced by the producers with Howard Stern. However, this change involved moving the venue for the live rounds of the competition from Los Angeles to Newark, New Jersey, which increased the size of the audience that attended each live episode. Along with a visual makeover of the program to improve its presentation on television, a planned break was included with the broadcast schedule between July 24 and August 14, to avoid clashing with the network's live coverage of the 2012 Summer Olympics.

The seventh season was won by dog tricks act Olate Dogs, with stand-up comedian Tom Cotter finishing in second, and earth harpist William Close placing third. During its broadcast, the season averaged around over 10 million viewers, but drew controversy for a participant who made claims that were later refuted after the broadcast of their audition.

Season overview 

Auditions for the seventh season's competition took place during Winter until mid-Spring 2012, with the main auditions being filmed in New York, Los Angeles, Tampa Bay, Austin, St. Louis and San Francisco. Additional auditions were held in Washington, D.C. and Charlotte, but were not filmed.

Following the conclusion of the sixth season's broadcast, Piers Morgan began contemplating his involvement with America's Got Talent, due to his increasing work schedule on other projects by that time. In November 2011, despite having signed a three-year contract the previous year, Morgan quit the show in order to focus on his commitment to producing Piers Morgan Tonight for CNN. Due to his Morgan's departure, radio personality Howard Stern was chosen to replace him in December. Since Stern had commitments to his SiriusXM radio show in New York that he could not abandon, filming of the live rounds moved from Los Angeles, opting for using the New Jersey Performing Arts Center in Newark, New Jersey. However, Stern was able to handle the involvement of the "Vegas Verdicts" segment without any issue.

While the use of the Performing Arts Center meant that audiences attending live rounds could be much larger than in previous years, the change in venue also allowed executive producer Simon Cowell to have the program undergo a significant "top-to-bottom makeover" of its presentation. Among these included new graphics, a new intro and a new theme song for America's Got Talent, along with an update to set pieces. A significant change was the appearance of the judges' desk, which was re-modeled to appear similar in design to that used on Britain's Got Talent. In addition to these changes, the 2012 Summer Olympics was taken into consideration, since the sporting event would receive live coverage from the network. Episode scheduling had to include a two-week hiatus between July 27 until August 12, as to avoid America's Got Talent clashing with its live broadcast.

Of the participants who auditioned for this season, sixty-two secured a place in the six live quarter-finals, with twelve in each round. The sixth quarter-final consisted of two participants selected from those that failed to reach the live rounds, along with ten quarter-finalists that had been eliminated in their respective rounds. About twenty-three quarter-finalists advanced and were split between the two semi-finals, with an additional semi-finalist being added in at the last minute. Six semi-finalists secured a place in the finals, which consisted of a single stage and not multiple rounds as in previous seasons. The following below lists the results of each participant's overall performance in this season:

 |  |  |  | 
 |  Wildcard Quarter-finalist

  Ages denoted for a participant(s), pertain to their final performance for this season.
  These participants were entered into the Wildcard quarter-final after losing their initial quarter-final.

Quarter-finals summary
 Buzzed Out |  Judges' choice | 
 |

Quarter-final 1 (July 2)
Guest Performers, Results Show: Cast of Cirque du Soleil: Zarkana, and will.i.am

Quarter-final 2 (July 10)
Guest Performers, Results Show: Gavin DeGraw, and TRACES

Quarter-final 3 (July 17)
Guest Performers, Results Show: Ashleigh and Pudsey, and Havana Brown

Quarter-final 4 (July 24)
Guest Performers, Results Show: Cher Lloyd, and the cast of Once

  For health & safety reasons, David Smith had to perform outside the studio; the judges were required to view the performance in person, and used hand-carried signs in place of their buzzers.

Quarter-final 5 - YouTube Round (August 14)
Guest Performers, Results Show: Gabby Douglas, Karmin, The Crazy Nastyass Honey Badger

  Due to complications, Cast In Bronze had to perform outside the studio; the judges were required to be in person to view the performance, and used hand-carried signs in place of their buzzers.

Quarter-final 6 Wild Card Round (August 21)
Guest Performers, Results Show: Owl City & Carly Rae Jepsen, and cast of Bring It On

Semi-finals summary
 Buzzed Out |  Judges' choice | 
 |

Semi-final 1 (August 28)
Guest Performers, Results Show: Neon Trees, and Steve Harvey

Semi-final 2 (September 4)
Guest Performers, Results Show: Train, Nathan Burton, and Haunted by Heroes with Dee Snider

  Due to live coverage of the NFL game between the Dallas Cowboys and the New York Giants, the results episode was aired the day after to avoid conflicting with it.

Finals (September 12)
Guest Performers, Results Show: Justin Bieber, Big Sean, Green Day, Joan Rivers, OneRepublic, Ne-Yo, Flo Rida, Frankie J, Blue Man Group, and Burton Crane

 |  |

Ratings
The following ratings are based upon those published by Nielsen Media Research after this season's broadcast:

Controversy

America's Got Talent faced controversy during its seventh season when it emerged that one of its participants had made a false claim that hadn't been properly checked. Minnesota National Guard sergeant Tim Poe, who made an audition for the season, claimed that an audible stutter he had was the result of an injury he sustained while operating with a military unit serving the War in Afghanistan. Although he provided evidence to back his claim, both the Associated Press and Minnesota National Guard refuted the documentation he provided, making clear that his condition could not be verified as occurring during his service in Afghanistan. Although Poe advanced no further, production staff would have had to face the question of disqualifying him from advancing into later stages for submitting a lie that had been broadcast on national television.

References

2012 American television seasons
America's Got Talent seasons